Ubiquitin carboxyl-terminal hydrolase 24 is an enzyme that in humans is encoded by the USP24 gene.

References

Further reading